Department of the Northern Territory may refer to:

 Department of the Northern Territory (1972–75), an Australian government department
 Department of the Northern Territory (1975–78), an Australian government department